This is a partial list of unnumbered minor planets for principal provisional designations assigned during 16–30 September 2002. , a total of 175 bodies remain unnumbered for this period. Objects for this year are listed on the following pages: A–B · C · D–F · G–K · L–O · P · Qi · Qii · Ri · Rii · S · Ti · Tii · U–V and W–Y. Also see previous and next year.

S 

|- id="2002 SB" bgcolor=#E9E9E9
| 0 || 2002 SB || MBA-M || 16.9 || 2.7 km || multiple || 2002–2020 || 11 Dec 2020 || 81 || align=left | Disc.: NEAT || 
|- id="2002 SF" bgcolor=#FFC2E0
| 5 || 2002 SF || AMO || 20.2 || data-sort-value="0.32" | 320 m || single || 39 days || 25 Oct 2002 || 35 || align=left | Disc.: AMOS || 
|- id="2002 SJ" bgcolor=#fefefe
| 1 || 2002 SJ || MBA-I || 17.5 || data-sort-value="0.94" | 940 m || multiple || 2002–2021 || 06 Jan 2021 || 187 || align=left | Disc.: NEATAlt.: 2008 GZ57 || 
|- id="2002 SN" bgcolor=#FFC2E0
| 0 || 2002 SN || AMO || 21.04 || data-sort-value="0.22" | 220 m || multiple || 2002–2021 || 01 Nov 2021 || 92 || align=left | Disc.: NEAT || 
|- id="2002 SQ" bgcolor=#FFC2E0
| 1 || 2002 SQ || APO || 19.6 || data-sort-value="0.43" | 430 m || multiple || 2002–2020 || 20 May 2020 || 210 || align=left | Disc.: NEAT || 
|- id="2002 SU" bgcolor=#FA8072
| 1 || 2002 SU || MCA || 17.0 || 1.2 km || multiple || 2002–2020 || 14 Jul 2020 || 64 || align=left | Disc.: NEAT || 
|- id="2002 SA1" bgcolor=#FA8072
| 1 ||  || MCA || 17.9 || 1.8 km || multiple || 2002–2020 || 25 Jul 2020 || 125 || align=left | Disc.: NEATAlt.: 2013 SW48 || 
|- id="2002 SA2" bgcolor=#E9E9E9
| 0 ||  || MBA-M || 17.3 || 1.9 km || multiple || 2002–2020 || 30 May 2020 || 64 || align=left | Disc.: NEAT || 
|- id="2002 SE2" bgcolor=#fefefe
| 0 ||  || MBA-I || 18.1 || data-sort-value="0.71" | 710 m || multiple || 1995–2020 || 17 Dec 2020 || 96 || align=left | Disc.: NEAT || 
|- id="2002 SM2" bgcolor=#d6d6d6
| 0 ||  || MBA-O || 17.0 || 2.2 km || multiple || 2002–2020 || 15 Feb 2020 || 158 || align=left | Disc.: NEATAlt.: 2013 QB27 || 
|- id="2002 SG3" bgcolor=#FA8072
| 1 ||  || MCA || 19.4 || data-sort-value="0.55" | 550 m || multiple || 2002–2015 || 09 Dec 2015 || 37 || align=left | Disc.: NEATAlt.: 2015 OL109 || 
|- id="2002 SM3" bgcolor=#fefefe
| 0 ||  || MBA-I || 18.0 || data-sort-value="0.75" | 750 m || multiple || 2002–2020 || 21 Jul 2020 || 129 || align=left | Disc.: NEAT || 
|- id="2002 SA4" bgcolor=#d6d6d6
| 0 ||  || MBA-O || 16.4 || 2.9 km || multiple || 2002–2019 || 08 Nov 2019 || 83 || align=left | Disc.: NEATAlt.: 2008 VP20 || 
|- id="2002 SU4" bgcolor=#fefefe
| 1 ||  || MBA-I || 18.5 || data-sort-value="0.59" | 590 m || multiple || 2002–2020 || 20 Oct 2020 || 95 || align=left | Disc.: NEATAlt.: 2013 UN37 || 
|- id="2002 SR7" bgcolor=#fefefe
| 0 ||  || MBA-I || 17.8 || data-sort-value="0.82" | 820 m || multiple || 2002–2019 || 26 Nov 2019 || 149 || align=left | Disc.: NEAT || 
|- id="2002 SU7" bgcolor=#fefefe
| 0 ||  || HUN || 18.4 || data-sort-value="0.62" | 620 m || multiple || 2001–2019 || 24 Jan 2019 || 49 || align=left | Disc.: NEATAlt.: 2015 VJ68 || 
|- id="2002 SQ8" bgcolor=#fefefe
| 0 ||  || MBA-I || 17.96 || data-sort-value="0.76" | 760 m || multiple || 2002–2022 || 27 Jan 2022 || 173 || align=left | Disc.: NEATAlt.: 2002 TS362, 2011 CW18 || 
|- id="2002 SW8" bgcolor=#fefefe
| 1 ||  || MBA-I || 18.4 || data-sort-value="0.62" | 620 m || multiple || 2002–2020 || 17 Nov 2020 || 75 || align=left | Disc.: NEATAlt.: 2009 QB42 || 
|- id="2002 SN9" bgcolor=#d6d6d6
| 0 ||  || MBA-O || 16.0 || 3.5 km || multiple || 2002–2019 || 18 Nov 2019 || 89 || align=left | Disc.: NEATAlt.: 2016 GA152 || 
|- id="2002 SZ10" bgcolor=#fefefe
| 0 ||  || MBA-I || 18.3 || data-sort-value="0.65" | 650 m || multiple || 2002–2019 || 04 Dec 2019 || 72 || align=left | Disc.: NEAT || 
|- id="2002 SD12" bgcolor=#E9E9E9
| 0 ||  || MBA-M || 17.7 || data-sort-value="0.86" | 860 m || multiple || 2002–2020 || 03 Feb 2020 || 75 || align=left | Disc.: NEATAlt.: 2006 QQ125 || 
|- id="2002 SK13" bgcolor=#d6d6d6
| 0 ||  || MBA-O || 17.54 || 1.7 km || multiple || 2002–2021 || 07 Jan 2021 || 44 || align=left | Disc.: LONEOSAlt.: 2019 PO26 || 
|- id="2002 SP13" bgcolor=#E9E9E9
| 1 ||  || MBA-M || 17.3 || 1.9 km || multiple || 2002–2021 || 08 Jan 2021 || 173 || align=left | Disc.: NEAT || 
|- id="2002 SU13" bgcolor=#E9E9E9
| 0 ||  || MBA-M || 16.96 || 1.7 km || multiple || 2002–2021 || 09 May 2021 || 315 || align=left | Disc.: NEATAlt.: 2015 WY15 || 
|- id="2002 SH14" bgcolor=#fefefe
| 0 ||  || MBA-I || 18.88 || data-sort-value="0.50" | 500 m || multiple || 2002–2021 || 07 Apr 2021 || 60 || align=left | Disc.: NEATAlt.: 2015 PE93 || 
|- id="2002 SA15" bgcolor=#E9E9E9
| 0 ||  || MBA-M || 17.2 || 2.0 km || multiple || 2002–2021 || 06 Jan 2021 || 209 || align=left | Disc.: NEAT || 
|- id="2002 SE16" bgcolor=#d6d6d6
| 0 ||  || MBA-O || 16.2 || 3.2 km || multiple || 2002–2020 || 01 Feb 2020 || 286 || align=left | Disc.: NEAT || 
|- id="2002 SB17" bgcolor=#E9E9E9
| 0 ||  || MBA-M || 16.69 || 1.9 km || multiple || 2002–2021 || 17 Apr 2021 || 353 || align=left | Disc.: NEAT || 
|- id="2002 SD17" bgcolor=#fefefe
| 0 ||  || MBA-I || 18.3 || data-sort-value="0.65" | 650 m || multiple || 2002–2020 || 10 Nov 2020 || 113 || align=left | Disc.: George Obs. || 
|- id="2002 SM17" bgcolor=#E9E9E9
| 0 ||  || MBA-M || 18.4 || data-sort-value="0.88" | 880 m || multiple || 2002–2019 || 21 Oct 2019 || 36 || align=left | Disc.: NEAT || 
|- id="2002 SV17" bgcolor=#d6d6d6
| 0 ||  || MBA-O || 16.06 || 3.4 km || multiple || 2002–2022 || 13 Jan 2022 || 144 || align=left | Disc.: NEATAlt.: 2013 SJ23 || 
|- id="2002 SX17" bgcolor=#d6d6d6
| 0 ||  || MBA-O || 15.74 || 4.0 km || multiple || 1991–2021 || 13 May 2021 || 253 || align=left | Disc.: NEAT || 
|- id="2002 SK19" bgcolor=#E9E9E9
| 1 ||  || MBA-M || 18.32 || 1.2 km || multiple || 2002-2022 || 03 Mar 2022 || 66 || align=left | Disc.: NEAT || 
|- id="2002 SF22" bgcolor=#E9E9E9
| 0 ||  || MBA-M || 17.5 || data-sort-value="0.94" | 940 m || multiple || 2002–2020 || 23 Jan 2020 || 121 || align=left | Disc.: NEATAlt.: 2006 PS24 || 
|- id="2002 SK22" bgcolor=#fefefe
| 0 ||  || MBA-I || 17.5 || data-sort-value="0.94" | 940 m || multiple || 2002–2020 || 23 Mar 2020 || 310 || align=left | Disc.: NEAT || 
|- id="2002 SC23" bgcolor=#d6d6d6
| 0 ||  || MBA-O || 16.0 || 3.5 km || multiple || 2002–2021 || 08 Jan 2021 || 138 || align=left | Disc.: NEAT || 
|- id="2002 SN26" bgcolor=#E9E9E9
| 0 ||  || MBA-M || 17.4 || 1.4 km || multiple || 2002–2019 || 26 Nov 2019 || 153 || align=left | Disc.: AMOS || 
|- id="2002 SW26" bgcolor=#E9E9E9
| – ||  || MBA-M || 18.5 || data-sort-value="0.59" | 590 m || single || 36 days || 11 Oct 2002 || 35 || align=left | Disc.: AMOS || 
|- id="2002 SY26" bgcolor=#FA8072
| 0 ||  || MCA || 18.75 || data-sort-value="0.53" | 530 m || multiple || 2002–2019 || 25 Nov 2019 || 98 || align=left | Disc.: AMOS || 
|- id="2002 SA28" bgcolor=#FA8072
| 0 ||  || MCA || 18.4 || data-sort-value="0.62" | 620 m || multiple || 2002–2020 || 22 Jan 2020 || 186 || align=left | Disc.: AMOS || 
|- id="2002 SF28" bgcolor=#fefefe
| 0 ||  || MBA-I || 18.4 || data-sort-value="0.62" | 620 m || multiple || 2002–2020 || 22 Jun 2020 || 63 || align=left | Disc.: Ondřejov Obs.Alt.: 2006 XG61, 2013 PZ28 || 
|- id="2002 SV28" bgcolor=#FA8072
| 1 ||  || MCA || 18.2 || data-sort-value="0.96" | 960 m || multiple || 2001–2019 || 25 May 2019 || 60 || align=left | Disc.: AMOS || 
|- id="2002 SP29" bgcolor=#E9E9E9
| 1 ||  || MBA-M || 19.15 || data-sort-value="0.62" | 620 m || multiple || 2002–2019 || 28 Nov 2019 || 44 || align=left | Disc.: NEATAlt.: 2019 TV21 || 
|- id="2002 SJ32" bgcolor=#E9E9E9
| 0 ||  || MBA-M || 16.9 || 1.8 km || multiple || 2002–2021 || 18 Jan 2021 || 324 || align=left | Disc.: AMOSAlt.: 2011 WY30 || 
|- id="2002 SQ33" bgcolor=#fefefe
| 0 ||  || MBA-I || 17.6 || data-sort-value="0.90" | 900 m || multiple || 2000–2021 || 05 Jan 2021 || 285 || align=left | Disc.: AMOSAlt.: 2013 VR17 || 
|- id="2002 SH34" bgcolor=#fefefe
| 0 ||  || MBA-I || 18.05 || data-sort-value="0.73" | 730 m || multiple || 2002–2021 || 27 Dec 2021 || 101 || align=left | Disc.: AMOSAlt.: 2013 QJ35 || 
|- id="2002 SC35" bgcolor=#E9E9E9
| 0 ||  || MBA-M || 18.1 || 1.3 km || multiple || 2002–2021 || 06 Jan 2021 || 211 || align=left | Disc.: AMOS || 
|- id="2002 SS35" bgcolor=#E9E9E9
| 0 ||  || MBA-M || 17.0 || 1.7 km || multiple || 2002–2021 || 03 Jan 2021 || 145 || align=left | Disc.: AMOSAlt.: 2015 PH310 || 
|- id="2002 SJ37" bgcolor=#fefefe
| 0 ||  || MBA-I || 17.8 || data-sort-value="0.82" | 820 m || multiple || 2001–2020 || 12 Dec 2020 || 221 || align=left | Disc.: AMOS || 
|- id="2002 SN39" bgcolor=#fefefe
| 1 ||  || MBA-I || 18.3 || data-sort-value="0.65" | 650 m || multiple || 2002–2019 || 24 Oct 2019 || 57 || align=left | Disc.: LINEAR || 
|- id="2002 SP39" bgcolor=#fefefe
| 0 ||  || MBA-I || 18.62 || data-sort-value="0.56" | 560 m || multiple || 2002–2021 || 11 Jul 2021 || 138 || align=left | Disc.: LINEARAlt.: 2002 TA97, 2015 RO37 || 
|- id="2002 SP41" bgcolor=#FA8072
| 0 ||  || MCA || 17.7 || data-sort-value="0.86" | 860 m || multiple || 2002–2019 || 03 Dec 2019 || 65 || align=left | Disc.: LINEAR || 
|- id="2002 SQ41" bgcolor=#FFC2E0
| 4 ||  || APO || 20.1 || data-sort-value="0.34" | 340 m || single || 22 days || 21 Oct 2002 || 77 || align=left | Disc.: AMOSPotentially hazardous object || 
|- id="2002 SD42" bgcolor=#E9E9E9
| 0 ||  || MBA-M || 17.5 || 1.3 km || multiple || 2002–2019 || 29 Sep 2019 || 64 || align=left | Disc.: NEAT || 
|- id="2002 SZ43" bgcolor=#d6d6d6
| 0 ||  || MBA-O || 16.38 || 2.9 km || multiple || 2002–2021 || 18 Apr 2021 || 209 || align=left | Disc.: LPL/Spacewatch IIAlt.: 2014 SW323 || 
|- id="2002 SW44" bgcolor=#E9E9E9
| 0 ||  || MBA-M || 17.22 || 1.5 km || multiple || 2002–2021 || 10 Apr 2021 || 156 || align=left | Disc.: AMOSAlt.: 2010 HD137, 2015 VF114 || 
|- id="2002 SY46" bgcolor=#FA8072
| 0 ||  || MCA || 18.14 || data-sort-value="0.70" | 700 m || multiple || 2002–2022 || 06 Jan 2022 || 350 || align=left | Disc.: AMOS || 
|- id="2002 SQ47" bgcolor=#E9E9E9
| 1 ||  || MBA-M || 17.2 || 1.1 km || multiple || 2002–2020 || 31 Jan 2020 || 82 || align=left | Disc.: LINEARAlt.: 2006 RU10 || 
|- id="2002 SU47" bgcolor=#E9E9E9
| 0 ||  || MBA-M || 17.09 || 2.1 km || multiple || 2002–2022 || 25 Jan 2022 || 250 || align=left | Disc.: LINEARAlt.: 2015 OR1 || 
|- id="2002 SX47" bgcolor=#fefefe
| 1 ||  || MBA-I || 18.5 || data-sort-value="0.59" | 590 m || multiple || 2002–2021 || 07 Jan 2021 || 56 || align=left | Disc.: LINEAR || 
|- id="2002 SN49" bgcolor=#fefefe
| 0 ||  || MBA-I || 18.29 || data-sort-value="0.65" | 650 m || multiple || 1999–2021 || 11 Jun 2021 || 154 || align=left | Disc.: LINEARAlt.: 2011 GP79, 2015 VG47 || 
|- id="2002 SL51" bgcolor=#fefefe
| 0 ||  || MBA-I || 17.9 || data-sort-value="0.78" | 780 m || multiple || 2002–2021 || 12 Jan 2021 || 146 || align=left | Disc.: NEAT || 
|- id="2002 SK52" bgcolor=#fefefe
| 0 ||  || MBA-I || 18.20 || data-sort-value="0.68" | 680 m || multiple || 2002–2021 || 02 Dec 2021 || 161 || align=left | Disc.: NEAT || 
|- id="2002 SN59" bgcolor=#d6d6d6
| 0 ||  || MBA-O || 16.5 || 2.8 km || multiple || 2002–2020 || 02 Feb 2020 || 86 || align=left | Disc.: NEATAlt.: 2015 BY491 || 
|- id="2002 SR59" bgcolor=#fefefe
| 0 ||  || MBA-I || 18.55 || data-sort-value="0.58" | 580 m || multiple || 2002–2021 || 22 Apr 2021 || 126 || align=left | Disc.: AMOS || 
|- id="2002 SP60" bgcolor=#E9E9E9
| 0 ||  || MBA-M || 17.04 || 1.6 km || multiple || 2002–2022 || 27 Jan 2022 || 176 || align=left | Disc.: NEAT || 
|- id="2002 SE63" bgcolor=#d6d6d6
| 0 ||  || MBA-O || 17.0 || 2.2 km || multiple || 2002–2019 || 03 Nov 2019 || 51 || align=left | Disc.: NEATAlt.: 2007 LU17 || 
|- id="2002 SF63" bgcolor=#E9E9E9
| 0 ||  || MBA-M || 16.8 || 1.8 km || multiple || 2002–2021 || 18 Jan 2021 || 239 || align=left | Disc.: NEAT || 
|- id="2002 SJ63" bgcolor=#fefefe
| 1 ||  || MBA-I || 18.2 || data-sort-value="0.68" | 680 m || multiple || 2002–2021 || 06 Jan 2021 || 81 || align=left | Disc.: NEAT || 
|- id="2002 SM63" bgcolor=#fefefe
| 0 ||  || MBA-I || 18.4 || data-sort-value="0.62" | 620 m || multiple || 2002–2019 || 03 Dec 2019 || 61 || align=left | Disc.: NEAT || 
|- id="2002 SN63" bgcolor=#fefefe
| 0 ||  || MBA-I || 18.36 || data-sort-value="0.63" | 630 m || multiple || 2002–2022 || 25 Jan 2022 || 107 || align=left | Disc.: NEAT || 
|- id="2002 SR63" bgcolor=#E9E9E9
| 0 ||  || MBA-M || 17.45 || data-sort-value="0.96" | 960 m || multiple || 2002–2021 || 01 May 2021 || 100 || align=left | Disc.: NEATAlt.: 2012 CA30 || 
|- id="2002 SU63" bgcolor=#E9E9E9
| 3 ||  || MBA-M || 18.0 || 1.4 km || multiple || 2002–2016 || 02 Nov 2016 || 25 || align=left | Disc.: NEAT || 
|- id="2002 SA64" bgcolor=#d6d6d6
| 0 ||  || MBA-O || 16.18 || 3.2 km || multiple || 2002–2021 || 06 Apr 2021 || 247 || align=left | Disc.: NEATAlt.: 2010 JM101, 2016 AQ306 || 
|- id="2002 SE64" bgcolor=#E9E9E9
| 0 ||  || MBA-M || 16.4 || 2.2 km || multiple || 2002–2021 || 03 Feb 2021 || 83 || align=left | Disc.: NEATAlt.: 2011 WO28 || 
|- id="2002 SK64" bgcolor=#E9E9E9
| 3 ||  || MBA-M || 18.3 || data-sort-value="0.92" | 920 m || multiple || 2002–2019 || 28 Nov 2019 || 42 || align=left | Disc.: NEAT || 
|- id="2002 SN64" bgcolor=#fefefe
| 1 ||  || HUN || 18.5 || data-sort-value="0.59" | 590 m || multiple || 2002–2021 || 15 Jan 2021 || 100 || align=left | Disc.: NEAT || 
|- id="2002 SS64" bgcolor=#fefefe
| 0 ||  || MBA-I || 17.9 || data-sort-value="0.78" | 780 m || multiple || 2002–2020 || 27 Feb 2020 || 49 || align=left | Disc.: NEATAlt.: 2014 SO216 || 
|- id="2002 ST64" bgcolor=#fefefe
| 0 ||  || HUN || 18.40 || data-sort-value="0.62" | 620 m || multiple || 2002–2022 || 22 Jan 2022 || 119 || align=left | Disc.: NEATAlt.: 2013 YP111, 2018 SG6 || 
|- id="2002 SW64" bgcolor=#E9E9E9
| 0 ||  || MBA-M || 17.00 || 1.2 km || multiple || 2002–2021 || 05 Jul 2021 || 91 || align=left | Disc.: NEATAlt.: 2002 TT317, 2010 RC36, 2014 RX52 || 
|- id="2002 SY64" bgcolor=#fefefe
| 1 ||  || MBA-I || 18.6 || data-sort-value="0.57" | 570 m || multiple || 2002–2019 || 10 Jun 2019 || 68 || align=left | Disc.: NEAT || 
|- id="2002 SD65" bgcolor=#E9E9E9
| 2 ||  || MBA-M || 18.9 || data-sort-value="0.70" | 700 m || multiple || 2002–2019 || 30 Nov 2019 || 46 || align=left | Disc.: NEAT || 
|- id="2002 SG65" bgcolor=#FA8072
| 0 ||  || MCA || 19.57 || data-sort-value="0.36" | 360 m || multiple || 2002–2019 || 24 Aug 2019 || 32 || align=left | Disc.: NEAT || 
|- id="2002 SM65" bgcolor=#E9E9E9
| 3 ||  || MBA-M || 18.1 || data-sort-value="0.71" | 710 m || multiple || 2002–2014 || 21 Jun 2014 || 47 || align=left | Disc.: NEATAlt.: 2006 OG3 || 
|- id="2002 SN65" bgcolor=#d6d6d6
| 0 ||  || MBA-O || 16.95 || 2.3 km || multiple || 2002–2020 || 21 Feb 2020 || 95 || align=left | Disc.: NEATAlt.: 2013 RH27 || 
|- id="2002 SO65" bgcolor=#E9E9E9
| 0 ||  || MBA-M || 17.7 || 1.6 km || multiple || 2002–2020 || 17 Oct 2020 || 85 || align=left | Disc.: NEATAlt.: 2011 QG32 || 
|- id="2002 SP65" bgcolor=#fefefe
| 1 ||  || MBA-I || 18.1 || data-sort-value="0.71" | 710 m || multiple || 2002–2019 || 20 Dec 2019 || 82 || align=left | Disc.: NEATAlt.: 2012 SR7 || 
|- id="2002 SS65" bgcolor=#E9E9E9
| 0 ||  || MBA-M || 17.7 || 1.6 km || multiple || 2002–2020 || 11 Oct 2020 || 67 || align=left | Disc.: NEAT || 
|- id="2002 ST65" bgcolor=#fefefe
| 2 ||  || MBA-I || 19.3 || data-sort-value="0.41" | 410 m || multiple || 2002–2020 || 29 Jun 2020 || 27 || align=left | Disc.: NEATAlt.: 2013 SA99 || 
|- id="2002 SV65" bgcolor=#fefefe
| 0 ||  || MBA-I || 18.3 || data-sort-value="0.65" | 650 m || multiple || 2002–2020 || 02 Feb 2020 || 127 || align=left | Disc.: NEATAlt.: 2012 VV92 || 
|- id="2002 SG66" bgcolor=#E9E9E9
| 0 ||  || MBA-M || 17.88 || data-sort-value="0.79" | 790 m || multiple || 2002–2019 || 19 Dec 2019 || 94 || align=left | Disc.: NEAT || 
|- id="2002 SK66" bgcolor=#fefefe
| 1 ||  || MBA-I || 18.6 || data-sort-value="0.57" | 570 m || multiple || 2002–2019 || 05 Oct 2019 || 39 || align=left | Disc.: NEAT || 
|- id="2002 SL66" bgcolor=#E9E9E9
| 0 ||  || MBA-M || 17.6 || 1.3 km || multiple || 2002–2015 || 15 Sep 2015 || 52 || align=left | Disc.: NEATAlt.: 2011 UV394 || 
|- id="2002 SN66" bgcolor=#E9E9E9
| 1 ||  || MBA-M || 16.8 || 1.3 km || multiple || 2002–2021 || 16 Jan 2021 || 124 || align=left | Disc.: NEATAlt.: 2013 EU77 || 
|- id="2002 SV66" bgcolor=#fefefe
| 0 ||  || MBA-I || 18.04 || data-sort-value="0.73" | 730 m || multiple || 2002–2021 || 29 Sep 2021 || 89 || align=left | Disc.: NEAT || 
|- id="2002 SX66" bgcolor=#E9E9E9
| 0 ||  || MBA-M || 16.7 || 1.9 km || multiple || 2002–2021 || 15 Jan 2021 || 112 || align=left | Disc.: NEATAlt.: 2011 UZ153 || 
|- id="2002 SB67" bgcolor=#d6d6d6
| 0 ||  || MBA-O || 16.60 || 2.7 km || multiple || 2002–2021 || 14 Apr 2021 || 103 || align=left | Disc.: NEAT || 
|- id="2002 SE67" bgcolor=#fefefe
| 0 ||  || MBA-I || 17.8 || data-sort-value="0.82" | 820 m || multiple || 2002–2021 || 08 Jan 2021 || 184 || align=left | Disc.: NEAT || 
|- id="2002 SF67" bgcolor=#d6d6d6
| 0 ||  || MBA-O || 16.4 || 2.9 km || multiple || 2002–2021 || 02 Jun 2021 || 121 || align=left | Disc.: AMOS || 
|- id="2002 SK67" bgcolor=#E9E9E9
| 0 ||  || MBA-M || 17.65 || 1.6 km || multiple || 2001–2021 || 30 Nov 2021 || 86 || align=left | Disc.: NEATAdded on 24 December 2021 || 
|- id="2002 SN67" bgcolor=#E9E9E9
| 0 ||  || MBA-M || 17.0 || 1.2 km || multiple || 2002–2021 || 17 Jan 2021 || 141 || align=left | Disc.: NEATAlt.: 2014 MB36 || 
|- id="2002 SR67" bgcolor=#d6d6d6
| 1 ||  || MBA-O || 17.2 || 2.0 km || multiple || 2002–2018 || 11 Oct 2018 || 37 || align=left | Disc.: NEAT || 
|- id="2002 SV67" bgcolor=#d6d6d6
| 0 ||  || MBA-O || 17.0 || 2.2 km || multiple || 1995–2020 || 23 Apr 2020 || 79 || align=left | Disc.: NEATAlt.: 2015 FL122 || 
|- id="2002 SB68" bgcolor=#E9E9E9
| 0 ||  || MBA-M || 17.3 || 1.9 km || multiple || 2002–2020 || 20 Dec 2020 || 118 || align=left | Disc.: NEATAlt.: 2011 SA245 || 
|- id="2002 SC68" bgcolor=#E9E9E9
| 1 ||  || MBA-M || 17.7 || 1.2 km || multiple || 2002–2020 || 16 Dec 2020 || 77 || align=left | Disc.: NEATAlt.: 2011 UO44 || 
|- id="2002 SG68" bgcolor=#d6d6d6
| – ||  || MBA-O || 17.4 || 1.8 km || single || 9 days || 05 Oct 2002 || 8 || align=left | Disc.: NEAT || 
|- id="2002 SH68" bgcolor=#fefefe
| – ||  || MBA-I || 19.5 || data-sort-value="0.37" | 370 m || single || 8 days || 04 Oct 2002 || 10 || align=left | Disc.: NEAT || 
|- id="2002 SJ68" bgcolor=#E9E9E9
| 0 ||  || MBA-M || 17.9 || 1.1 km || multiple || 1998–2021 || 15 Jan 2021 || 88 || align=left | Disc.: NEATAlt.: 2015 TT146 || 
|- id="2002 SO68" bgcolor=#FA8072
| – ||  || MCA || 20.0 || data-sort-value="0.30" | 300 m || single || 13 days || 28 Sep 2002 || 11 || align=left | Disc.: NEAT || 
|- id="2002 ST68" bgcolor=#E9E9E9
| 0 ||  || MBA-M || 17.77 || data-sort-value="0.83" | 830 m || multiple || 2002–2021 || 15 Apr 2021 || 60 || align=left | Disc.: NEAT || 
|- id="2002 SU68" bgcolor=#E9E9E9
| – ||  || MBA-M || 19.5 || data-sort-value="0.37" | 370 m || single || 2 days || 28 Sep 2002 || 6 || align=left | Disc.: NEAT || 
|- id="2002 SV68" bgcolor=#E9E9E9
| 0 ||  || MBA-M || 17.4 || data-sort-value="0.98" | 980 m || multiple || 2002–2019 || 08 Nov 2019 || 107 || align=left | Disc.: NEAT || 
|- id="2002 SW68" bgcolor=#fefefe
| 0 ||  || MBA-I || 19.2 || data-sort-value="0.43" | 430 m || multiple || 2002–2020 || 17 Oct 2020 || 46 || align=left | Disc.: NEAT || 
|- id="2002 SB69" bgcolor=#fefefe
| 0 ||  || MBA-I || 18.3 || data-sort-value="0.65" | 650 m || multiple || 2002–2020 || 16 Dec 2020 || 87 || align=left | Disc.: NEAT || 
|- id="2002 SG69" bgcolor=#d6d6d6
| 0 ||  || MBA-O || 16.8 || 2.4 km || multiple || 2002–2018 || 05 Oct 2018 || 36 || align=left | Disc.: NEAT || 
|- id="2002 SM69" bgcolor=#fefefe
| 1 ||  || MBA-I || 19.1 || data-sort-value="0.45" | 450 m || multiple || 2002–2019 || 30 Jun 2019 || 48 || align=left | Disc.: NEATAlt.: 2009 RM72 || 
|- id="2002 SN69" bgcolor=#E9E9E9
| 1 ||  || MBA-M || 17.5 || 1.8 km || multiple || 2002–2020 || 18 Sep 2020 || 62 || align=left | Disc.: NEAT || 
|- id="2002 SO69" bgcolor=#E9E9E9
| 0 ||  || MBA-M || 16.9 || 1.8 km || multiple || 2002–2021 || 19 Jan 2021 || 181 || align=left | Disc.: NEATAlt.: 2015 TW276 || 
|- id="2002 SP69" bgcolor=#d6d6d6
| 0 ||  || MBA-O || 16.9 || 2.3 km || multiple || 2002–2021 || 06 Apr 2021 || 39 || align=left | Disc.: NEAT || 
|- id="2002 SR69" bgcolor=#d6d6d6
| 0 ||  || MBA-O || 17.1 || 2.1 km || multiple || 2002–2018 || 14 Aug 2018 || 44 || align=left | Disc.: NEAT || 
|- id="2002 SU69" bgcolor=#fefefe
| 0 ||  || MBA-I || 18.50 || data-sort-value="0.59" | 590 m || multiple || 2002–2021 || 09 May 2021 || 62 || align=left | Disc.: NEAT || 
|- id="2002 SV69" bgcolor=#E9E9E9
| 3 ||  || MBA-M || 18.4 || data-sort-value="0.62" | 620 m || multiple || 2002–2006 || 30 Sep 2006 || 19 || align=left | Disc.: NEAT || 
|- id="2002 SG70" bgcolor=#fefefe
| 0 ||  || MBA-I || 18.2 || data-sort-value="0.68" | 680 m || multiple || 1995–2020 || 12 Dec 2020 || 106 || align=left | Disc.: NEAT || 
|- id="2002 SH70" bgcolor=#fefefe
| 1 ||  || MBA-I || 19.3 || data-sort-value="0.41" | 410 m || multiple || 2002–2020 || 14 Nov 2020 || 71 || align=left | Disc.: NEATAlt.: 2013 WF94 || 
|- id="2002 SC71" bgcolor=#fefefe
| 0 ||  || MBA-I || 18.7 || data-sort-value="0.54" | 540 m || multiple || 2002–2020 || 20 Oct 2020 || 77 || align=left | Disc.: NEAT || 
|- id="2002 SE71" bgcolor=#E9E9E9
| 3 ||  || MBA-M || 18.3 || data-sort-value="0.92" | 920 m || multiple || 2001–2019 || 19 Nov 2019 || 53 || align=left | Disc.: NEAT || 
|- id="2002 SF71" bgcolor=#d6d6d6
| 0 ||  || MBA-O || 16.1 || 3.4 km || multiple || 2002–2020 || 24 May 2020 || 185 || align=left | Disc.: NEATAlt.: 2015 FW342 || 
|- id="2002 SG71" bgcolor=#E9E9E9
| 0 ||  || MBA-M || 18.1 || 1.0 km || multiple || 2001–2019 || 31 Oct 2019 || 56 || align=left | Disc.: NEATAlt.: 2015 TU62 || 
|- id="2002 SZ71" bgcolor=#E9E9E9
| 0 ||  || MBA-M || 17.03 || 1.2 km || multiple || 2002–2021 || 06 May 2021 || 120 || align=left | Disc.: NEATAlt.: 2013 CJ127 || 
|- id="2002 SF72" bgcolor=#d6d6d6
| 0 ||  || MBA-O || 16.98 || 2.2 km || multiple || 2002–2021 || 15 Apr 2021 || 100 || align=left | Disc.: NEATAlt.: 2015 AH105, 2016 EA133 || 
|- id="2002 SG72" bgcolor=#d6d6d6
| 0 ||  || MBA-O || 16.32 || 3.0 km || multiple || 2002–2021 || 17 Apr 2021 || 155 || align=left | Disc.: NEATAlt.: 2008 SV206 || 
|- id="2002 SM72" bgcolor=#d6d6d6
| 0 ||  || MBA-O || 17.0 || 2.2 km || multiple || 2002–2021 || 07 Feb 2021 || 39 || align=left | Disc.: NEATAlt.: 2019 SD152 || 
|- id="2002 SP72" bgcolor=#E9E9E9
| 3 ||  || MBA-M || 18.8 || data-sort-value="0.73" | 730 m || multiple || 2002–2015 || 23 Sep 2015 || 23 || align=left | Disc.: NEAT || 
|- id="2002 SS72" bgcolor=#fefefe
| 0 ||  || MBA-I || 18.2 || data-sort-value="0.68" | 680 m || multiple || 2002–2019 || 29 Nov 2019 || 93 || align=left | Disc.: NEATAlt.: 2012 QQ1 || 
|- id="2002 SV72" bgcolor=#d6d6d6
| 0 ||  || MBA-O || 16.84 || 2.4 km || multiple || 2002–2021 || 08 May 2021 || 104 || align=left | Disc.: NEAT || 
|- id="2002 SZ72" bgcolor=#fefefe
| 1 ||  || MBA-I || 18.1 || data-sort-value="0.71" | 710 m || multiple || 2002–2018 || 28 Dec 2018 || 74 || align=left | Disc.: NEATAlt.: 2014 WX16 || 
|- id="2002 SA73" bgcolor=#fefefe
| 0 ||  || MBA-I || 18.0 || data-sort-value="0.75" | 750 m || multiple || 2002–2020 || 16 Oct 2020 || 102 || align=left | Disc.: NEAT || 
|- id="2002 SD73" bgcolor=#fefefe
| 0 ||  || MBA-I || 18.28 || data-sort-value="0.66" | 660 m || multiple || 2002–2021 || 11 Sep 2021 || 46 || align=left | Disc.: NEATAlt.: 2010 VL175, 2010 WN13 || 
|- id="2002 SF73" bgcolor=#fefefe
| 1 ||  || MBA-I || 18.5 || data-sort-value="0.59" | 590 m || multiple || 2002–2021 || 16 Jan 2021 || 80 || align=left | Disc.: NEAT || 
|- id="2002 SH73" bgcolor=#d6d6d6
| 0 ||  || MBA-O || 16.5 || 2.8 km || multiple || 2002–2019 || 20 Dec 2019 || 50 || align=left | Disc.: NEAT || 
|- id="2002 SK73" bgcolor=#fefefe
| 0 ||  || MBA-I || 18.7 || data-sort-value="0.54" | 540 m || multiple || 2002–2019 || 17 Nov 2019 || 51 || align=left | Disc.: NEAT || 
|- id="2002 SL73" bgcolor=#E9E9E9
| 0 ||  || MBA-M || 17.2 || 1.1 km || multiple || 2002–2019 || 26 Oct 2019 || 95 || align=left | Disc.: NEATAlt.: 2014 GJ48 || 
|- id="2002 SM73" bgcolor=#fefefe
| 1 ||  || MBA-I || 18.4 || data-sort-value="0.62" | 620 m || multiple || 2002–2019 || 24 Sep 2019 || 37 || align=left | Disc.: NEAT || 
|- id="2002 SN73" bgcolor=#E9E9E9
| 2 ||  || MBA-M || 18.6 || data-sort-value="0.80" | 800 m || multiple || 2002–2019 || 19 Nov 2019 || 37 || align=left | Disc.: NEAT || 
|- id="2002 SS73" bgcolor=#E9E9E9
| 0 ||  || MBA-M || 18.40 || data-sort-value="0.88" | 880 m || multiple || 2002–2019 || 29 Jun 2019 || 58 || align=left | Disc.: NEATAlt.: 2015 PY7 || 
|- id="2002 ST73" bgcolor=#d6d6d6
| 0 ||  || MBA-O || 17.2 || 2.0 km || multiple || 2002–2019 || 03 Oct 2019 || 48 || align=left | Disc.: NEATAlt.: 2008 WY18 || 
|- id="2002 SV73" bgcolor=#d6d6d6
| 2 ||  || MBA-O || 17.5 || 1.8 km || multiple || 2002–2018 || 17 Nov 2018 || 33 || align=left | Disc.: NEATAlt.: 2018 VY99 || 
|- id="2002 SW73" bgcolor=#fefefe
| 1 ||  || MBA-I || 18.8 || data-sort-value="0.52" | 520 m || multiple || 2002–2019 || 04 Dec 2019 || 42 || align=left | Disc.: NEAT || 
|- id="2002 SZ73" bgcolor=#d6d6d6
| 0 ||  || MBA-O || 17.4 || 1.8 km || multiple || 2002–2020 || 23 Dec 2020 || 45 || align=left | Disc.: NEATAlt.: 2013 RA10 || 
|- id="2002 SE74" bgcolor=#d6d6d6
| 0 ||  || MBA-O || 16.9 || 2.3 km || multiple || 2002–2021 || 18 Jan 2021 || 84 || align=left | Disc.: NEATAlt.: 2008 UF172 || 
|- id="2002 SF74" bgcolor=#E9E9E9
| 1 ||  || MBA-M || 18.1 || 1.0 km || multiple || 2002–2019 || 01 Nov 2019 || 45 || align=left | Disc.: NEAT || 
|- id="2002 SJ74" bgcolor=#E9E9E9
| 0 ||  || MBA-M || 17.14 || 2.1 km || multiple || 2002–2022 || 24 Jan 2022 || 142 || align=left | Disc.: AMOS || 
|- id="2002 SK74" bgcolor=#d6d6d6
| – ||  || HIL || 16.9 || 2.3 km || single || 8 days || 06 Oct 2002 || 9 || align=left | Disc.: AMOS || 
|- id="2002 SM74" bgcolor=#fefefe
| 1 ||  || MBA-I || 18.8 || data-sort-value="0.52" | 520 m || multiple || 2002–2020 || 27 Feb 2020 || 36 || align=left | Disc.: NEAT || 
|- id="2002 SP74" bgcolor=#fefefe
| 0 ||  || MBA-I || 17.9 || data-sort-value="0.78" | 780 m || multiple || 1995–2021 || 06 Jan 2021 || 105 || align=left | Disc.: SpacewatchAlt.: 1995 UR23, 2015 HL78 || 
|- id="2002 SQ74" bgcolor=#fefefe
| 0 ||  || MBA-I || 18.5 || data-sort-value="0.59" | 590 m || multiple || 1995–2020 || 11 Dec 2020 || 109 || align=left | Disc.: NEATAlt.: 2011 FD77 || 
|- id="2002 SS74" bgcolor=#E9E9E9
| 0 ||  || MBA-M || 18.0 || 1.4 km || multiple || 2002–2020 || 15 Aug 2020 || 118 || align=left | Disc.: NEATAlt.: 2016 UA98 || 
|- id="2002 SV74" bgcolor=#E9E9E9
| 1 ||  || MBA-M || 18.0 || 1.1 km || multiple || 2002–2021 || 15 Jan 2021 || 64 || align=left | Disc.: AMOS || 
|- id="2002 SX74" bgcolor=#d6d6d6
| 0 ||  || MBA-O || 17.21 || 2.0 km || multiple || 2002–2021 || 21 Nov 2021 || 170 || align=left | Disc.: NEATAlt.: 2014 EB147 || 
|- id="2002 SY74" bgcolor=#fefefe
| 0 ||  || MBA-I || 17.8 || data-sort-value="0.82" | 820 m || multiple || 2002–2021 || 18 Jan 2021 || 93 || align=left | Disc.: NEATAlt.: 2009 QF20 || 
|- id="2002 SC75" bgcolor=#E9E9E9
| 2 ||  || MBA-M || 18.3 || data-sort-value="0.65" | 650 m || multiple || 2002–2019 || 31 Dec 2019 || 50 || align=left | Disc.: NEAT || 
|- id="2002 SD75" bgcolor=#FA8072
| 0 ||  || HUN || 18.7 || data-sort-value="0.54" | 540 m || multiple || 2002–2020 || 17 Nov 2020 || 128 || align=left | Disc.: NEATAlt.: 2014 FR38 || 
|- id="2002 SH75" bgcolor=#E9E9E9
| 1 ||  || MBA-M || 17.6 || 1.3 km || multiple || 2002–2021 || 12 Jan 2021 || 95 || align=left | Disc.: NEATAlt.: 2015 TV243 || 
|- id="2002 SJ75" bgcolor=#d6d6d6
| – ||  || MBA-O || 17.0 || 2.2 km || single || 10 days || 06 Oct 2002 || 9 || align=left | Disc.: NEAT || 
|- id="2002 SL75" bgcolor=#fefefe
| 2 ||  || MBA-I || 18.82 || data-sort-value="0.45" | 520 m || multiple || 2002-2022 || 17 Nov 2022 || 12 || align=left | Disc.: NEATAlt.: 2016 SV102 || 
|- id="2002 SM75" bgcolor=#E9E9E9
| 1 ||  || MBA-M || 18.3 || data-sort-value="0.92" | 920 m || multiple || 2002–2015 || 02 Nov 2015 || 27 || align=left | Disc.: NEAT || 
|- id="2002 SN75" bgcolor=#d6d6d6
| 0 ||  || MBA-O || 16.27 || 3.1 km || multiple || 2002–2021 || 02 Dec 2021 || 168 || align=left | Disc.: NEATAlt.: 2014 OM280 || 
|- id="2002 SO75" bgcolor=#d6d6d6
| 0 ||  || MBA-O || 16.5 || 2.8 km || multiple || 2002–2018 || 07 Aug 2018 || 57 || align=left | Disc.: NEATAlt.: 2008 WK57, 2015 BN367, 2016 GR155 || 
|- id="2002 SP75" bgcolor=#d6d6d6
| 0 ||  || MBA-O || 15.0 || 3.7 km || multiple || 2002–2021 || 16 Jan 2021 || 262 || align=left | Disc.: NEATAlt.: 2003 YV109, 2008 UO399, 2010 GT70 || 
|- id="2002 SR75" bgcolor=#d6d6d6
| 0 ||  || MBA-O || 16.3 || 3.1 km || multiple || 2002–2018 || 12 Oct 2018 || 115 || align=left | Disc.: AMOSAlt.: 2018 SA9 || 
|- id="2002 SS75" bgcolor=#fefefe
| 1 ||  || MBA-I || 17.8 || data-sort-value="0.82" | 820 m || multiple || 2002–2020 || 17 Oct 2020 || 46 || align=left | Disc.: NEAT || 
|- id="2002 ST75" bgcolor=#fefefe
| 0 ||  || MBA-I || 17.8 || data-sort-value="0.82" | 820 m || multiple || 2002–2018 || 17 Nov 2018 || 97 || align=left | Disc.: NEATAlt.: 2002 TA384, 2014 WM78 || 
|- id="2002 SU75" bgcolor=#d6d6d6
| 0 ||  || MBA-O || 16.5 || 2.8 km || multiple || 2002–2021 || 11 Jun 2021 || 79 || align=left | Disc.: NEAT || 
|- id="2002 SV75" bgcolor=#fefefe
| 0 ||  || MBA-I || 18.2 || data-sort-value="0.68" | 680 m || multiple || 2002–2020 || 17 Nov 2020 || 114 || align=left | Disc.: AMOS || 
|- id="2002 SW75" bgcolor=#E9E9E9
| 0 ||  || MBA-M || 17.5 || 1.3 km || multiple || 2002–2019 || 19 Nov 2019 || 79 || align=left | Disc.: LONEOS || 
|}
back to top

References 
 

Lists of unnumbered minor planets